Point of appearance is a generic term for any point in a telephone/data circuit from which a technician can test or pull stats. Some appearances are virtual, such as a Digital cross connect system computer terminal. Others are physical, like a punch down COSMIC frame where a technician can place a test set, or a heat coil socket. In the outside plant there is an appearance at the cross box, pedestal, and network interface device. The ultimate appearance is the telephone or other customer premises equipment (CPE).

See also
Demarcation point
Point of presence

Communication circuits